Treon Harris is an American college football player. He began his college football career at the University of Florida as a quarterback, before transferring from the school in 2017 to Tennessee State University (TSU) where he started out as a quarterback before finishing his college career as a wide receiver.

High school career
Harris was a three-year starter at quarterback for Booker T. Washington High School in Miami, Florida, and led his high school football team to state championships in 2012 and 2013. Coming out of high school, Harris was recruited by former Gators' offensive coordinator, Kurt Roper. Harris originally committed to play for the Florida State Seminoles, but flipped to the Gators on national signing day.

College career

Florida
Harris accepted an athletic scholarship to attend the University of Florida in Gainesville, Florida, and play for the Florida Gators football team, beginning in 2014.  After previous Gators starting quarterback Jeff Driskel was injured during the Gators' game versus the Tennessee Volunteers, Harris replaced him and helped the Gators win 10–9.

After an embarrassing homecoming loss to Missouri, Florida coach Will Muschamp named Treon Harris the starter against No. 11 Georgia Bulldogs. Harris, a true freshman, led the Gators to an upset victory in his first start, beating the Bulldogs 38–20. He completed three of his six passes for 27 yards and rushed for six times that gained 31 yards.

In his second collegiate start, Harris faced the Vanderbilt Commodores. Harris completed 13 of his 21 passes for 215 yards. Treon Harris also did some damage on the ground. He rushed for ten times that gained 49 yards and scored two touchdowns, including a 33-yard touchdown that put the game away. Harris led the Gators to another victory, beating the Commodores 34–10 on the road. Harris's third collegiate start was against South Carolina Gamecocks. Harris completed 5 of 11 passes for 60 yards with one touchdown and zero interceptions. Harris also had big ground game with 20 rushes for 111 total yards and no touchdowns. Although a strong effort Harris suffered his first collegiate loss as a starter in a 23–20 overtime loss to the Gamecocks. During his 2014 freshman season, Harris compiled 1,019 passing yards with nine passing touchdowns and four interceptions.  As a rusher, Harris had 332 yards and three touchdowns.

In 2015, Harris was the starting quarterback for the season opener, but lost his starting job to Will Grier after the opening game. After Grier tested positive for a banned substance and was suspended by the NCAA, Harris reclaimed the starting quarterback job and started the final eight games of the season. He finished the 2015 season with 1,676 passing yards, 9 touchdowns, and 6 interceptions.

In January 2016, Harris and wide receiver Antonio Callaway were suspended from the team. Florida head coach Jim McElwain said the suspensions were related to "schoolwork." It was later revealed that the suspensions were related to an accusation of sexual assault. A woman accused Callaway of sexual assault and Harris of attempted sexual assault in December 2015. The woman reported the alleged incident to Florida's student conduct and conflict resolution office, but did not report the incident to either Gainesville police or University of Florida police. The University of Florida suspended both players for violating the school's code of conduct policy. Both players remained suspended until June, when they returned to campus to take classes and work out at the school's facilities. On July 25, 2016, the school confirmed that Harris was transferring from the University of Florida.

Tennessee State
On January 6, 2017, Nashville, Tennessee newspaper (The Tennessean) reported that Treon Harris visited Tennessee State during the fall and has decided to continue his career with the Tigers. Tennessee State University coach Rod Reed said "Back during the fall when (Harris) didn't return to Florida and we were dealing with some injuries at quarterback and needed a guy that could come in we started a conversation with him." "He came up and visited for our game against Eastern Kentucky and liked what he saw. We stayed in contact after that." "He completed 50 percent of his passes with 18 touchdowns so he can run and throw the ball." "He's athletic and will fit into our system and what we like to do."

At TSU, Harris will be in competition for the starting quarterback position with O'Shay Ackerman-Carter, who started in seven games as a redshirt freshman in 2015 and three in 2016. Ackerman-Cater suffered season-ending injuries a shoulder injury in 2015 and a knee injury in 2016.

Coach Reed said "O'Shay doesn't mind that we're bringing in another quarterback; O'Shay's a competitor." "Obviously we saw over the last two years we need two really good quarterbacks." Ultimately, Treon Harris would win the competition for the starting quarterback position over Ackerman-Carter, who would transfer from Tennessee State.

For the 2017 season, Harris shared playing time at the quarterback position for Tennessee State Tigers with redshirt sophomore Michael Hughes. Starting in 5 of 6 games played at quarterback, Treon Harris completed 58-of-106 passes for 729 yards with 2 touchdowns and 2 interceptions, in addition to rushing 54 times for 318 yards and 3 touchdowns. Most notably, in the season opener versus FBS Georgia State, Harris put up 236 total yards, including 91 rushing yards and a rushing touchdown, in a 17–10 upset.

On March 19, 2018, The Tennessean reported that Harris transitioned to wide receiver. In the 2018 season, Treon Harris caught 35 passes for 476 yards and 5 touchdowns. After the season, he was named to the 2018 Phil Steele All-Ohio Valley Conference Third Team.

Personal life
Treon is the son of Tim "Ice" Harris, a well-known Florida high school football coach. His brother is pro football player Brandon Harris.

References

Year of birth missing (living people)
1990s births
Living people
Booker T. Washington Senior High School (Miami, Florida) alumni
Players of American football from Miami
American football quarterbacks
Florida Gators football players
Tennessee State Tigers football players